Bistriopelma lamasi is a species of theraphosine tarantula, which is native to Peru.

Etymology
The specific name lamasi is in honour of Gerardo Lamas Müller, who specialized in butterflies and collected the types.

Characteristic features
B. lamasi has a deep fovea and the spermathecae have large granules, and has a well developed basal tubercle.

References

Theraphosidae
Endemic fauna of Peru
Fauna of Peru
Spiders described in 2015
Spiders of South America